John Felix Tamargo (born November 7, 1951) is a former Major League Baseball catcher and coach and long-time minor league manager. He played all or part of five seasons in the majors from  until . He currently serves as the Latin America Field Coordinator for the Seattle Mariners organization.

Playing career 
Tamargo was drafted out of Tampa Catholic High School by the New York Yankees in 1969, but did not sign, choosing instead to attend Georgia Southern University. He was drafted three more times in the next two years, but did not sign with a team until being drafted by the St. Louis Cardinals in the 6th round of the 1973 Major League Baseball draft. He made his major league debut with the Cardinals on September 3, 1976. He played in just 20 games with St. Louis from 1976–78.

In July, 1978, San Francisco Giants catcher Mike Sadek was injured, and they acquired Tamargo from the Cardinals as a replacement. He spent the rest of the season with the Giants, splitting time with starting catcher Marc Hill. He started the 1979 season with the Giants, but was traded to the Montreal Expos on June 13. He was initially assigned to the minor league Denver Bears, but returned to the majors in August, but appeared in just 12 games over the remainder of the season.

Tamargo spent the entire 1980 season with the Expos, the only full season he spent in the major leagues. Serving as backup to future Hall of Famer Gary Carter, he appeared in 37 games, batting .275. The following season he spent the entire season back with the Bears, his last season as a player.

Managerial and coaching career 
He then joined the New York Mets organization, for which he worked from  until  in various capacities. In , he managed the Binghamton Mets to the championship of the Eastern League.

In , Tamargo moved the Houston Astros organization, managing the Kissimmee Cobras. The next season, he won his second championship as a manager with the New Orleans Zephyrs of the Pacific Coast League. From  until , he was a coach for the MLB Houston Astros.

On January 13, Tamargo was named the manager of the Everett AquaSox in the Seattle Mariners organization. He was named manager of the Class-A Clinton LumberKings of the Midwest League after the '09 season. During the 2010 season, his son John Jr. served as hitting coach of the Lansing Lugnuts, which played in the same league. The two managed against each other in one game when John Jr. served as the Lugnuts acting manager. His son was promoted to manager of the Lugnuts before the 2012 season, and was named hitting coach of the Dunedin Blue Jays prior to the 2015 season.

Tamargo was named to his current position as Latin America Field Coordinator after the 2010 season.

References

External links

1951 births
Living people
American expatriate baseball players in Canada
Arkansas Travelers players
Baseball coaches from Florida
Baseball players from Florida
Binghamton Mets managers
Denver Bears players
Durham Bulls managers
Georgia Southern Eagles baseball players
Houston Astros coaches
Major League Baseball bench coaches
Major League Baseball catchers
Miami Dade Sharks baseball players
Modesto Reds players
Montreal Expos players
New Orleans Pelicans (baseball) players
San Francisco Giants players
Springfield Redbirds players
St. Louis Cardinals players
St. Petersburg Cardinals players
Tulsa Oilers (baseball) players